In the customs of the kingdom of England, the caput baroniae (Latin, 'head of the barony') was the ancient, or chief seat or castle of a nobleman, which was not to be divided among the daughters upon his death, in case there be no son to inherit. Instead, it was to descend entirely to the eldest daughter, caeteris filiabus aliunde satisfactis (other daughters satisfied elsewhere).

The central settlement in an Anglo-Saxon multiple estate was called a caput, (also short for caput baroniae). The word is also used for the centre of administration of a hundred.

References

English family law
Feudalism in England
English society